Lukáš Leginus (born 24 April 2000) is a Slovak footballer who plays for DAC Dunajská Streda of the Fortuna Liga as an right-winger, on loan from FC ŠTK 1914 Šamorín.

Club career

DAC Dunajská Streda
Leginus made his professional Fortuna Liga debut for DAC in an home fixture against FK Železiarne Podbrezová on 23 October 2022, replacing Ammar Manaf Ramadan in the 57th minute of the game.

References

External links
 FC DAC 1904 Dunajská Streda official club profile 
 Futbalnet profile 
 
 

2000 births
Living people
People from Senec District
Sportspeople from the Bratislava Region
Slovak footballers
Association football forwards
FC ŠTK 1914 Šamorín players
FC DAC 1904 Dunajská Streda players
Slovak Super Liga players
2. Liga (Slovakia) players